Guy Gordon Hurlbutt (born January 23, 1942) is an Idaho lawyer, a former United States Attorney, a former federal judicial nominee to the United States Court of Appeals for the Ninth Circuit and a former Idaho state official.

Early life and education 

A native of Georgia, Hurlbutt earned a bachelor's degree in forestry in 1964 from the University of Georgia.  He later earned a law degree from the University of South Carolina School of Law and a master's degree in environmental law from George Washington University.

Professional career 

Early in his career, Hurlbutt was a chief deputy attorney general under then-Idaho Attorney General Wayne L. Kidwell.  Hurlbutt went into private legal practice in 1978.

On September 17, 1981, Hurlbutt was nominated by President Ronald Reagan to be a United States Attorney for the District of Idaho to replace M. Karl Shurtliff.  Hurlbutt had been recommended by then-Sen. James A. McClure.  After confirmation by the United States Senate, Hurlbutt served as a United States Attorney until 1984, when he took a job with Boise Cascade as its associate general counsel.  Hurlbutt eventually was replaced as U.S. Attorney for Idaho by Maurice Owens Ellsworth.

Failed nomination to the Ninth Circuit 

On August 11, 1988, President Reagan nominated Hurlbutt to a seat on the United States Court of Appeals for the Ninth Circuit to replace Judge J. Blaine Anderson, who had died on April 16, 1988.  However, since Hurlbutt's nomination came after July 1, 1988, the unofficial start date of the Thurmond Rule during a presidential election year, no hearings were scheduled on Hurlbutt's nomination, and the nomination was returned to Reagan at the end of his term.  After President George H. W. Bush was elected, he chose not to renominate Hurlbutt for the post, selecting Thomas G. Nelson instead.

Later career 

In 1997, Hurlbutt became Boise Cascade's director of environmental affairs, and he assumed responsibility for governmental affairs in 1998.

Hurlbutt's final position with Boise Cascade was as vice president of public policy and environment.  He retired from the company in 2004.

References 

1942 births
Living people
Idaho lawyers
University of Georgia alumni
George Washington University alumni